Wood Lake Township may refer to the following townships in the United States:

 Wood Lake Township, Yellow Medicine County, Minnesota
 Wood Lake Township, Benson County, North Dakota